The 1865 Grand National was the 27th renewal of the Grand National horse race that took place at Aintree near Liverpool, England, on 8 March 1865.

Finishing Order

Non-finishers

References

 1865
Grand National
Grand National
19th century in Lancashire
March 1865 sports events